Corinth is an unincorporated community in Walker County, Alabama, United States. Corinth is located along County Route 61 near the northern border of Cordova.

References

Unincorporated communities in Walker County, Alabama
Unincorporated communities in Alabama